Néstor Octavio Gordillo Castillo (born 26 February 1962) is a Mexican politician affiliated with the PAN. He currently serves as Deputy of the LXII Legislature of the Mexican Congress representing Chiapas.

References

1962 births
Living people
People from Chiapas
National Action Party (Mexico) politicians
21st-century Mexican politicians
Deputies of the LXII Legislature of Mexico
Members of the Chamber of Deputies (Mexico) for Chiapas